"I Could Love You (With My Eyes Closed)" is a song recorded by American country music group The Remingtons.  It was released in February 1992 as the second single from the album Blue Frontier.  The song reached #33 on the Billboard Hot Country Singles & Tracks chart.  The song was written by group members Richard Mainegra and Rick Yancey.

Critical reception
Lisa Smith and Cyndi Hoelzle of Gavin Report praised the song's vocal harmonies.

Chart performance

References

1992 singles
1992 songs
The Remingtons songs
Songs written by Richard Mainegra
Song recordings produced by Josh Leo
BNA Records singles